The Edwardians is a television miniseries or anthology series which was produced by the BBC, and first aired on BBC Television in 1972–73. In the United States, the series aired on PBS's Masterpiece Theatre in 1974.  Consisting of eight 90 minute episodes, each episode examines a different individual of historical importance from the Edwardian era with one episode being devoted to Henry Royce and Charles Rolls. The figures who have a single episode devoted to each are Horatio Bottomley; E. Nesbit; Sir Arthur Conan Doyle; Robert Baden-Powell; Marie Lloyd; Daisy Greville, Countess of Warwick; and David Lloyd George.

Cast
Thorley Walters as	King Edward VII (in two episodes)
Michael Jayston as Henry Royce
Robert Powell as Charles Rolls
Timothy West as Horatio Bottomley
Judy Parfitt as E. Nesbit
Nigel Davenport as Sir Arthur Conan Doyle
Ron Moody as Robert Baden-Powell
Georgia Brown as Marie Lloyd
Virginia McKenna as Daisy Greville
Anthony Hopkins as David Lloyd George

Episodes

References

External links
The Edwardians at IMDB

1970s British television miniseries
Cultural depictions of David Lloyd George
Cultural depictions of Edward VII